Navi is an Indian financial services company founded by Sachin Bansal and Ankit Agarwal in 2018. Navi operates in the space of digital Loans, home loans, mutual funds, health insurance and micro-loans. It currently has $100 million in revenue with $10 million in profit. Mahendra Singh Dhoni is the brand ambassador of Navi Technologies Ltd.

History
In December 2018, Sachin Bansal, after his exit from Flipkart, along with IIT-Delhi batch mate Ankit Agarwal, founded BACQ Acquisitions Private Limited which was later renamed as Navi Technologies Private Limited. The company has its headquarters in Bengaluru. 

Navi acquired consulting firm MavenHive in 2019, in order to boost product development. The company operates from office in Bengaluru’s Koramangala area.

On 12 March 2022 Navi filed a draft for an INR 3350 crore IPO.

Subsidiaries
Navi Technologies is the holding company and the subsidiaries are structured as

 Navi Finserv – Personal loan
 Navi General Insurance – Health Insurance and others
 Chaitanya Finance

Navi Finserv

In October 2019, Navi acquired Bengaluru based NBFC Chaitanya Rural Intermediation Development Services Private Limited (CRIDS) along with its wholly owned microfinance-NBFC Chaitanya India Private Limited (CIPL). CRIDS was later renamed as Navi Finserv Private Limited.

Navi launched a lending app for instant personal loans in June 2020,Karnataka. CRISIL assigned a credit rating of A− (A minus) to the company’s borrowcare.

Navi Mutual Fund
Navi acquired Essel Mutual Fund, which was given approval by SEBI in December 2020.
In May 2021, Navi Mutual Fund moved their headquarters from Mumbai to Bengaluru, making it the first Bengaluru – headquartered asset management company.

Navi General Insurance
The company acquired DHFL General Insurance in January 2020 and renamed as Navi General Insurance Limited. It launched Navi Health, a ‘2-Minute’ online retail health insurance product, in 2021.

Chaitanya Microfinance
Chaitanya India Fin Credit Private Limited (CIFCPL) is a microfinance institution (MFI), which started operations from October 2009. It is fully held by the parent company Navi Finserv. CIFCPL lends to women, primarily in rural areas, under the Grameen Bank Group Lending model. It offers microfinance loans under the joint liability group model as well as individual loans.

As on 31 December 2020, CIFCPL was operating out of 6 states across 12 districts with 1.59 lakh active borrowers.

ICRA assigned a credit rating of A+ (A minus) to the company’s borrowings.

References

External links 

 Official Website

2018 establishments in Karnataka
Companies based in Bangalore
Indian brands
Indian companies established in 2018
Privately held companies of India